Camillo Giardina (March 29, 1907 – February 26, 1985) was an Italian Christian Democrat politician. He was minister of health (1959–1962) in the Government of Italy.

Biography
Son of a doctor and academic from the University of Pavia, Andrea Giardina, originally from Sicily, active in the Catholic movement and member of the People's Party. The family moved to Palermo and in 1929, Camillo Giardina obtained a degree in law from the city university.

In 1931 he obtained the free lecturer in history of law; first at the University of Urbino, until 1933, and then at that of Messina, where he remained until 1937, the year in which he became full professor. In 1940 he was called to the chair of the history of Italian law in Palermo, where he remained until the end academic career.

In 1942 he joined the underground movement of the Christian Democrats, a party of which he became a leading exponent. Provincial secretary from 1946 to 1948, he was elected Senator in the first legislature and re-elected consecutively until 1963.

He served as Minister for Reform of Public Administration in the Zoli government and as Minister of Health in the Tambroni government.

References

1907 births
1985 deaths
Politicians from Pavia
Christian Democracy (Italy) politicians
Italian Ministers of Health
Senators of Legislature I of Italy
Senators of Legislature II of Italy
Senators of Legislature III of Italy
Senators of Legislature IV of Italy
Senators of Legislature V of Italy